Ulrich Schillinger (born 16 February 1945) is a former German cyclist. He competed in the sprint at the 1964 Summer Olympics.

References

External links
 

1945 births
Living people
German male cyclists
Olympic cyclists of the United Team of Germany
Cyclists at the 1964 Summer Olympics
Cyclists from Munich